Murilo Radke (born ) is a Brazilian male volleyball player. He is part of the Brazil men's national volleyball team. He played at the 2011 Pan American Games and 2015 Pan American Games. On club level he plays for the Greek club Foinikas Syros.

Clubs
  Sada Cruzeiro (2008–2010)
  Pinheiros (2010–2011)
  Cimed Florianópolis (2011–2012)
  Vôlei Renata (2012–2013)
  APAV Vôlei (2013–2014)
  Budvanska Rivijera Budva (2014–2015)
  Chemik Bydgoszcz (2015–2016)
  América Vôlei (2016–2017)
  Jeopark Kula Belediyespor (2017–2018)
  Arkas Spor (2018–2019)
  Argos Volley (2019–2020)
  Foinikas Syros (2020–2021)
  Funvic Vôlei (2021)

Sporting achievements

Clubs
  2009 South American Club Championship – with Sada Cruzeiro

National team
 2009  FIVB U21 World Championship
 2011  Pan American Games
 2013  Pan-American Cup
 2014  FIVB World League
 2015  Pan American Games

References

External links
 profile at FIVB.org

1989 births
Living people
Brazilian men's volleyball players
Place of birth missing (living people)
Pan American Games medalists in volleyball
Pan American Games gold medalists for Brazil
Pan American Games silver medalists for Brazil
Expatriate volleyball players in Poland
Universiade medalists in volleyball
Volleyball players at the 2011 Pan American Games
Volleyball players at the 2015 Pan American Games
Universiade bronze medalists for Brazil
Medalists at the 2011 Summer Universiade
Medalists at the 2011 Pan American Games
Medalists at the 2015 Pan American Games
Sportspeople from Porto Alegre